Benjamin Constant was a training ship that belonged to the Benjamin Constant-class of the Brazilian Navy. It was the first ship in the Navy to bear this name and the first to be designed from the beginning as a training ship. Built in 1891 and launched in 1892, it had a long career, making dozens of instruction trips, and also secured Brazilian possession of Trindade Island. It had the nicknames "Cisne Branco" ("White Swan" in English), due to its white paint and "Beijoca" ("Smack" in English). The ship was discharged from service on February 22, 1926, being dismantled in 1949 after a fire in 1938.

General characteristics 
Benjamin Constant displaced 2,311 tons of water when almost empty and 2,750 tons when full. The ship's propulsion consisted of triple-expansion engines that generated  which allowed it to reach .

Armament 
The armament consisted of four 150-millimeter Armstrong guns situated on two barbettes (one on the forecastle and one on the bridge), eight 120-millimeter Armstrong guns, four 57-millimeter Nordenfelt guns (two at the stern and two on the bow), six 25-millimeter machine guns, four 17-millimeter machine guns, and torpedo launcher tubes.

Armor 
The ship's deck was protected by thirty to fifty-millimeter-thick plates while its gangway was protected by eighty-millimeter-thick plates. The hull was made of wood covered with copper and steel plates.

History

Early years 
Benjamin Constant had its keel laid on November 18, 1891, at the Forges et chantiers de la Méditerranée shipyard in La Seyne, Toulon. It was launched the following year with the first task of providing accommodation for the crew of Admiral Barroso, which had recently sunk. Although the ship was launched in 1892, it was only incorporated into the Navy on May 10, 1894, as a consequence of the Navy revolt. Once the delivery was made, it was taken over by Frigate Captain Antonio Alves Câmara. He sailed from La Seyne on July 18, arriving in Rio de Janeiro on September 4.

From February 18 to March 13, 1895, the ship made a cruise originating in the state of Bahia. When the cruise was over, Joaquim José Rodrigues Torres Sobrinho took over as Frigate Captain. He commanded another cruise going as far as Pará, visiting Trindade Island in order to secure Brazilian presence in the region that was being disputed with the British.

In 1897, the ship conducted another instruction cruise to Europe and the United States. The cruiser was integrated into the Instruction Division. It was commanded by Afonso de Alencastro Graça and Joaquim Marques Leão. In 1898, the captain of the frigate Duarte Huet de Bacelar took charge. His first action as commander of Benjamin Constant was to travel along the Brazilian coast, starting with Trindade Island, passing Fernando de Noronha and Belém in Pará.

1901–1908 
In 1901, the ship undertook another instructional cruise, traveling to Recife, Barbados, New York, Plymouth, and Cherbourg. During the trip, Frigate Captain José Martins de Toledo suffered from an unknown illness and was replaced by his first mate and Lieutenant Captain Carlos Pereira Lima. On December 24, 1906, he returned to Rio de Janeiro, ending the instruction of the class of 1906. On this trip, he visited the ports of Salvador, São Vicente, São Miguel dos Açores, Plymouth, Anvers, Kristiansand, Copenhagen, Stockholm, Kiel, Willenshaven, Amsterdam, Le Havre, Cherbourg, Lisbon, and Las Palmas. 

On January 22, 1908, Benjamin Constant sailed with fourteen newly trained Second Lieutenants. This was the third time a Brazilian ship set sail on a circumnavigation trip. The places visited were: Uruguay, Chile, Peru, Hawaii, Japan, China, Hong Kong, Singapore, Ceylon, Aden, Egypt, Italy, France, Gibraltar, and Recife-PE, returning to Rio de Janeiro on December 16. It took in twenty Japanese castaways from the Toyoshima Maru on this voyage, remaining in repair from November 7 to 8 during its docking in Toulon.

1909–1913 
In 1909, the Benjamin Constant transported the crew of the battleship  to Newcastle (where the battleship was being built). In 1910, the ship represented Brazil at the centennial of Mexico's independence. From February 12 to 16, 1913, it was docked at Ilha das Cobras to have some of its copper plates replaced. During this period, Benjamin Constant received a group of fourth-year students from the Naval School to prepare for their next instruction cruise. The training ship left Ilha das Cobras on February 20, passing through Pernambuco and Bahia, and returning on March 15.

In April, after a supply ship was delayed, the Benjamin Constant was requested by the government to transport the supplies to the Rocas Atoll Lighthouse which had notified an English merchant ship passing by of the delay in supplies. This merchant ship relayed the message to the government.

On May 5, the ship made another training cruise. This time, with a group of second lieutenants, it sailed from Rio de Janeiro, passing through Recife from May 12 to 16; Belém from May 22 to 27; Barbados from June 2 to 8; Santiago de Cuba from June 14 to 21; New York from June 28 to July 13, and Plymouth from July 28 to 30. After spending four days in Devenport Bay, the vessel sailed to Portsmouth, arriving there on August 3 and staying until August 24. It returned to Amsterdam from August 25 to September 2; Cherbourg from September 4 to 13; Brest from September 14 to 26; Lisbon from September 30 to October 10; Las Palmas from October 14 to 18; and Recife from November 1 to 7, returning to Rio de Janeiro on November 12.

Fate 
The years from 1914 to 1915 were regular for Benjamin Constant, but in 1916, the vessel's trips began to consist of short instruction cruises within the national territory. On February 22, 1926, the vessel was removed from active service, under Notice No. 578. The ship became, under Notice No. 643, the headquarters of the Auxiliary-Specialist Schools. In 1938, it suffered a fire. Eleven years later, it was dismantled in the Santos Estuary.

See also 
 List of ships of the Brazilian Navy

References 

1892 ships
Ships of the Brazilian Navy